Suspended Animation is an album by The Monks, released in 1981 in Canada on the Polydor label. In Germany it was released on CBS.

This album was the follow-up to the band's debut album, Bad Habits.  The songs are composed by Richard Hudson, John Ford, and Terry Cassidy.

The album was reissued in the U.K., on CD for the first time, on August 24, 1999 on the Resurgent label. It was released yet again on January 12, 2009 on Angel Air Records. The re-released versions of the album featured six additional songs, from the band's never-completed third album, Cybernetic Sister.

In 2004, John Ford featured "Suspended Animation" on his solo album Backtracking, released on Whole Shot Records.

Track listing
"Don't Want No Reds" - 2:53
"Suspended Animation" - 4:43
"Don't Bother Me - I'm a Christian" - 3:21
"James Bondage" - 3:11
"Grown-ups" - 2:47
"Oxford Street" - 4:06
"Cool Way to Live" - 3:07
"Go" - 4:09
"I Can Do Anything You Like" - 3:15
"Plastic Max" - 4:20
"King Dong" - 4:04
"Space Fruit" - 3:46

1999/2009 re-release bonus tracks
"Gold and Silver"
"Cybernetic Sister"
"Ann Orexia"
"Beasts in Cages"
"Slimy Gash"
"Lost in Romance"

Personnel
 Brian Willoughby - electric and acoustic guitars, backing vocals, synthesizer
 John Ford - electric and acoustic guitars, backing vocals, synthesizer
 Terry Cassidy - synthesizer, lead and backing vocals, clarinet
 Richard Hudson - bass, backing vocals, sitar, guitar, synthesizer
 Oliver Pierce - drums, backing vocals, percussion

Album information
German issue: CBS Records 85 396 
Canadian issue:  Polydor PDS 1-6214
SJPCD 279 (Angel Air 2009 re-release) ASIN: B00000JQLU

References

External links
 Angel Air Re-Release
 

1981 albums
Polydor Records albums